Hoseynabad-e Amiri (also Romanized as Ḩoseynābād-e Amīrī; also known as Ḩoseynjān and Ḩoseynābād) is a village in Yusefvand Rural District, in the Central District of Selseleh County, Lorestan Province, Iran. At the 2006 census, its population was 104, in 20 families.

References 

Towns and villages in Selseleh County